Fear No Evil may refer to:
 Psalm 23

Books 

I Will Fear No Evil, a 1970 science fiction novel by Robert A. Heinlein
Cat Fear No Evil, a book in The Joe Grey Mysteries
Fear No Evil (book), a 1998 book by Natan Sharansky

Films 

Fear No Evil (1945 film), 1945 film directed by Giuseppe Maria Scotese
Fear No Evil (1969 film), a 1969 made-for-television horror film
Fear No Evil (1981 film), 1981 horror film directed by Frank LaLoggia

Music 

Fear No Evil (Grim Reaper album), 1985 album by Grim Reaper
Fear No Evil (Slaughter album), a 1995 album by Slaughter
Fear No Evil (Doro album), a 2009 album by Doro